Sikwane is a village in Kgatleng District of Botswana. The village is located 55 km east of Gaborone, close to the border with South Africa, and has primary and secondary schools. The population was 1,585 in 2001 census.

References

Kgatleng District
Villages in Botswana
Botswana–South Africa border crossings